Efimenko, Yefimenko, or Jefimenko is a gender-neutral Ukrainian surname. It may refer to:
 Alexei Yefimenko (born 1985), Belarusian ice hockey player
 Anna Efimenko (born 1980), Russian Paralympic swimmer
 Dmytro Yefimenko (born 2001), Ukrainian footballer
 Liubov Efimenko (born 1999), Finnish figure skater
 Maria Efimenko (born 1996), Ukrainian chess player
 Oleg D. Jefimenko (1922–2009), Ukrainian-American physicist
 Olha Yefimenko (born 1978), Ukrainian diver
 Tatyana Efimenko (born 1981), Kyrgyzstani high jumper
 Zahar Efimenko (born 1985), Ukrainian chess player

See also
 
 

Ukrainian-language surnames